Earl Johnson II, better known by his stage name Earl St. Clair, is an American record producer, vocalist, and songwriter.

Early life
Earl St. Clair was born in Cleveland, Ohio, and grew up between there and Alabama.

Musical career
St. Clair began his career as a record producer, being credited as JP Did This 1.

He expected to primarily work as a producer and co-writer and not as a solo artist. He signed to Def Jam Recordings in 2016.

In June, he made his television debut on The Late Show with Stephen Colbert, performing "Perfect" with fellow Def Jam artist Bibi Bourelly.

In August, he released his debut single, "Man on Fire".

He released his debut album, Songs About A Girl I Used To Know, in 2017.

Stage name
He explained his stage name in an interview with ThisIsRnB: "Earl St.Clair came from the irony from the fact that where I started producing in Cleveland, the street I was working on was St. Clair. It was 129 and St. Clair. Then when I got out to California ... the studio that I was working in was located on  St Clair."

References

External links

Record producers from Alabama
Record producers from Ohio
American male singers
American male songwriters
Living people
Singers from Alabama
Singers from Ohio
Musicians from Cleveland
Year of birth missing (living people)